Cecil Alexander (Tiny) Cathers (21 April 1901 – 6 December 1989) was a Progressive Conservative party member of the House of Commons of Canada. He was born in Toronto, Ontario and became a business executive and farmer by career.

He was first elected at the York North riding in the 1957 general election after a previous unsuccessful attempt to win a seat there in the 1953 election. Cathers was re-elected in the 1958 election, but defeated by John Addison of the Liberal party in the 1962 election.

Cathers died at Toronto's Queen Elizabeth Hospital on 6 December 1989.

References

External links
 

1901 births
1989 deaths
Businesspeople from Toronto
Canadian business executives
Members of the House of Commons of Canada from Ontario
Politicians from Toronto
Progressive Conservative Party of Canada MPs